Chalek Deh (also Romanized as Chālek Deh) is a village in Panj Hezareh Rural District, in the Central District of Behshahr County, Mazandaran Province, Iran. At the 2006 census, its population was 82, in 22 families.

References 

Populated places in Behshahr County